Dane Kelly (born 9 February 1991) is a Jamaican professional footballer who plays as a striker for Charlotte Independence. With 85 regular season goals, Kelly is the all-time leading scorer in the USL Championship.

Professional career

Tivoli Gardens
Kelly began his career in his native Jamaica with top-flight Jamaica National Premier League side Tivoli Gardens. He led the U21 JPL league in scoring in 2010–2011 with 15 goals.

Charleston Battery
Kelly moved to the United States in 2011 after to attend open tryouts with the Charleston Battery after being spotted by the club during a scouting trip to Jamaica. After impressing coach Mike Anhaeuser during a 2011 Carolina Challenge Cup game against Toronto FC, Kelly signed with the Battery on 16 March and made his debut with the team on 9 April 2011 in a game against the Charlotte Eagles.

In 2014, Kelly was named the club's player of the year and earned first team all-USL honors. In 2015, he scored 11 goals in 26 league appearances and had a man of the match performance with a goal and an assist in a 3–2 victory over NASL side Fort Lauderdale Strikers in the third round of the Lamar Hunt U.S. Open Cup. With his final goal of the season, the 42nd of his Charleston career, Kelly became the all-time leading scorer in the current United Soccer League, passing Matthew Delicate.

Swope Park Rangers
Kelly signed with Sporting Kansas City's USL affiliate side Swope Park Rangers on 16 December 2015. He scored his first goal for the club on 2 April against Tulsa Roughnecks FC. Kelly suffered a hamstring injury that ruled him out for nine games before returning against Vancouver Whitecaps FC 2 on 12 June.

Reno 1868
Kelly signed with Reno 1868 of the USL in 2017. He earned the 2017 USL MVP and Golden Boot award, leading the league with 18 goals scored.

D.C. United
On 9 March 2018, Kelly signed with MLS club D.C. United. He scored his first unofficial goal for D.C. on 19 September 2018, in a friendly against C.D. Olimpia.

Indy Eleven
On 16 January 2019, Kelly signed with USL Championship side Indy Eleven.

Charlotte Independence
On 27 January 2020, Kelly moved again, joining USL Championship side Charlotte Independence. He scored a hat trick against Charlotte's in-state rival North Carolina FC on 5 September 2020.

Bnei Sakhnin
In early 2021, Kelly signed with Israeli Premier League side Bnei Sakhnin. His only goal for the club came in an Israel State Cup game against Hapoel Hadera.

Return to Charlotte Independence
On 19 May 2021, Kelly re-signed with Charlotte Independence following his spell in Israel.

Pittsburgh Riverhounds SC
Following the 2021 season, Charlotte Independence voluntarily self-relegated to USL League One. Kelly stayed in the USL Championship by signing with Pittsburgh Riverhounds SC on January 7, 2022. On March 15, 2022, Kelly was named USL Championship Player of the Week for Week 1, having scored his 100th regular season goal in the league against Memphis 901 on March 12, 2022.

Third spell at Charlotte Independence
On 2 March 2023, Kelly returned to Charlotte Independence for the third time, joining ahead of the 2023 USL League One season.

International career
In 2017, Kelly was called up to the Jamaica senior national team. He scored his first goal against South Korea an exhibition match that ended 2–2

Career statistics

Club

International goals
Scores and results list Jamaica's goal tally first.

Honors
USL
Champions (1): 2012
MVP (1): 2017
Golden Boot (1): 2017

References

External links
 

1991 births
Living people
Jamaican footballers
Jamaican expatriate footballers
Tivoli Gardens F.C. players
Charleston Battery players
Sporting Kansas City II players
Reno 1868 FC players
D.C. United players
Expatriate soccer players in the United States
USL Championship players
Major League Soccer players
Richmond Kickers players
People from Saint Catherine Parish
Association football forwards
National Premier League players
Indy Eleven players
Charlotte Independence players
Jamaican expatriate sportspeople in the United States
Jamaica international footballers
Bnei Sakhnin F.C. players
Pittsburgh Riverhounds SC players
Jamaican expatriate sportspeople in Israel
Expatriate footballers in Israel